Brinton Beauregard Davis (January 23, 1862 – June 27, 1952) was an architect in Kentucky. More than a dozen of his works are listed on the National Register of Historic Places.

Biography
Davis was born on January 23, 1862, in Natchez, Mississippi. His parents were Jacob Davis and Mary Davis née Gamble.

He married Clara Benbrook on February 23, 1889, and they had two children.

In 1892, Davis began practicing as an architect in Paducah, Kentucky, but in 1902, he moved his practice to Louisville, where he stayed for the remainder of his career.

He served as a captain of infantry in the Third Kentucky Volunteers during the Spanish–American War.

Davis died in Louisville on June 27, 1952, and was interred in Cave Hill Cemetery.

Some of his works were covered in a study, "Buildings on the Western Kentucky University campus TR".

Works

 Duncan, Stuart E. and Annie L., Estate, 404 Mockingbird Valley Rd., Louisville, KY (Davis, Brinton B.) NRHP-listed
 Pioneer Log Cabin, Kentucky St., near jct. with University Dr., Bowling Green, KY (Davis, Brinton B.) NRHP-listed
 Board of Extension of the Methodist Episcopal Church, South, 1115 S. 4th St., Louisville, KY (Davis, Brinton B.) NRHP-listed
 Cherry Hall, College St., Western Kentucky University campus, Bowling Green, KY (Davis, Brinton B.) NRHP-listed
 Fire Department Headquarters, 1135 W. Jefferson St., Louisville, KY (Davis, Brinton B.) NRHP-listed
 Health Buildings-Gymnasium, Normal Dr., Western Kentucky University campus, Bowling Green, KY (Davis, Brinton B.) NRHP-listed
 Heating Plant, Dogwood Dr., Western Kentucky University campus, Bowling Green, KY (Davis, Brinton B.) NRHP-listed
 Home Economics Building, State St., Western Kentucky University campus, Bowling Green, KY (Davis, Brinton B.) NRHP-listed
 Industrial Arts Building, State St., Western Kentucky University campus, Bowling Green, KY (Davis, Brinton B.) NRHP-listed
 Inter-Southern Insurance Building (later called the Kentucky Home Life Building), 239-247 S. 5th St., Louisville, KY (Davis, Brinton,B.) NRHP-listed
 Jefferson County Armory (later called Louisville Gardens), 525 W. Muhammad Ali Blvd., Louisville, KY (Davis, Brinton B.) NRHP-listed
 Kentucky Building, Russellville Rd., Western Kentucky University campus, Bowling Green, KY (Davis, Brinton B.) NRHP-listed
 Kentucky Electric Building, 619 S Fourth St, Louisville, Kentucky
 President's Home, State St., Western Kentucky University campus, Bowling Green, KY (Davis, Brinton B.) NRHP-listed
 Snell, Perry, Hall, State St., Western Kentucky University campus, Bowling Green, KY (Davis, Brinton B.) NRHP-listed
 Springfield Baptist Church, Lincoln Park Rd., Springfield, KY (Davis, Brinton B.) NRHP-listed
 Stadium, Russellville Rd., Western Kentucky University campus, Bowling Green, KY (Davis, Brinton B.) NRHP-listed
 Van Meter Hall, 15th St., Western Kentucky University campus, Bowling Green, KY (Davis, Brinton B.) NRHP-listed
 West Hall, Virginia Garrett Ave., Western Kentucky University campus, Bowling Green, KY (Davis, Brinton B.) NRHP-listed
 Gordon Wilson Hall, 15th St., Western Kentucky University campus, Bowling Green, KY (Davis, Brinton B.) NRHP-listed

References

1862 births
1952 deaths
People from Natchez, Mississippi
People from Paducah, Kentucky
Architects from Mississippi
Architects from Kentucky
Architects from Louisville, Kentucky
Burials at Cave Hill Cemetery
American military personnel of the Spanish–American War